Camphorweed is a common name for several plants and may refer to:

Heterotheca subaxillaris, native to North America
Pluchea